Du Bois-Reymond may refer to:

 Emil du Bois-Reymond (1818–1896), German physician and physiologist
 Eveline Du Bois-Reymond Marcus (1901–1990), German zoologist
 Paul du Bois-Reymond (1831–1889), German mathematician

See also
Dubois (surname)
Reymond

Compound surnames
German-language surnames
Surnames of French origin